HC-12a, also called ES-12a, OZ-12a, DURACOOL 12a and Hydrocarbon Blend B, is a "drop-in" replacement refrigerant for Freon-12 and to a lesser extent, R-134a. HC-12a is a mixture of hydrocarbons, specifically propane (R-290) and isobutane (R-600a), and is therefore considered nearly non-ozone-depleting when compared to dichlorodifluoromethane (R-12, Freon-12) or 1,1,1,2-tetrafluoroethane (R-134a). The mixture can be used in refrigeration systems designed for R-12. HC-12a provides better cooling than an R-12 system retrofitted to R-134a, with much greater energy efficiency as well. Unlike R-134a, HC-12a is completely compatible with the hoses and oils used in R-12 systems, making the conversion much easier to accomplish. HC-12a is also patent-free due to its non-synthetic nature.

Because of its high flammability, it is unacceptable to replace R-12 with HC-12a in the United States. Thus its use in public transport vehicles is illegal in the United States since 1990.

Some advantages to using the HC-12a mixture over retrofitting to R-134a are cost and labor. Since HC-12a is a "drop-in" replacement, no seals need to be replaced and minimal effort has to be put into changing the refrigeration system around. The refrigerant used is propane and other hydrocarbons which are flammable.

The refrigerant ignited due to an electrical spark which followed a refrigerant leak, eventually warming and later quickly setting an ICE bus ablaze as the fire spread from the refrigeration system towards the interior of the bus, this combined with a lack of emergency exits, the location of the engine (and refrigeration system compressor, which is often open and pulley-driven by the ICE engine and thus leak-prone in ICE vehicles), which was located below a cover on the inner side of the only passenger exit door, and a lack of fire extinguishers led to the tragedy. A lawsuit in a US court against Northcutt, which imported the HC-12 involved in the tragedy, and OZ technology, Inc., which manufactured the HC-12 began in 2008; in 2018, Northcutt reached a settlement with the victims of the tragedy and their relatives.

References

External links
 MSDS for HC-12a

Refrigerants